The Puente de la Barqueta (literally "bridge of the barges", in reference to the formerly present "Barqueta Gate"), officially named Puente Mapfre, is a bridge in the city of Seville (Andalusia, Spain), which spans the Alfonso XII channel of the Guadalquivir river. It constituted one of the main means of access to the Isla de la Cartuja ("Cartuja island").

It was built between 1989 and 1992, on the occasion of the Universal Exposition Expo'92, and conceived as the main gate for this.

References

Barqueta
Barqueta
World's fair architecture in Seville
Seville Expo '92
Bridges over the Guadalquivir River